SunStar (also written as Sun Star), stylized as SUNSTAR (formerly SUN•STAR), is an English-language newspaper in the Philippines. The newspaper is based in Cebu City.

Regional 

 SunStar Cebu
 SunStar Davao
 SunStar Manila
 SunStar Dumaguete
 SunStar Bacolod
 SunStar Iloilo
 SunStar Baguio
 SunStar Cagayan de Oro
 SunStar Pampanga
 SunStar Pangasinan
 SunStar Tacloban
 SunStar Zamboanga

References

External links
 

 
National newspapers published in the Philippines
English-language newspapers published in the Philippines
Companies based in Cebu City
Publications established in 1982